Hugh Henry Breckenridge (1870-1937), was an American painter and art instructor who championed the artistic movements from impressionism to modernism. Breckenridge taught for more than forty years at the Pennsylvania Academy of Fine Arts, becoming the school's Dean of Instruction in 1934. He also taught from 1920 to 1937 at his own Breckenridge School of Art in Gloucester, Massachusetts.

Biography
Breckenridge was born on October 6, 1870 in Leesburg, Virginia. He attended the Pennsylvania Academy of the Fine Arts where he met first met William Edmondson. In 1892, he traveled to Paris where he studied under Adolphe William Bouguereau. He travelled through Europe with his colleague Walter E. Schofield.

In 1894 when he returned to Philadelphia he began his career at the Pennsylvania Academy of the Fine Arts (PAFA), where he would teach for more than forty years.

Breckenridge opened his own school in Gloucester, Massachusetts, the Breckenridge School of Art, where he taught summer classes every year from 1920 to 1937.

Breckenridge exhibited widely from 1896 until his death, starting at the Art Club of Philadelphia and, towards the end of his life, in 1934, at the Whitney Museum. His work was included in the 1926 Philadelphia Sesqui-Centennial Exhibition.

Breckenridge was a member of the Philadelphia Art Alliance, Philadelphia Sketch Club, and the Arts Club of Philadelphia.

He died on November 4, 1937 in Philadelphia, while he was still on the faculty of the PAFA.

Notable students 

Walter Inglis Anderson
Sarah Baker
Walter Emerson Baum
Maude Drein Bryant
Arthur Beecher Carles
Elizabeth Kitchenman Coyne
Edith Emerson
Nancy Maybin Ferguson
Allan Freelon
Ella Sophonisba Hergesheimer
Marie Hull
Thomas Lorraine Hunt
Susette Schultz Keast
Harriet Randall Lumis
John Marin
Delle Miller
Fritz Pfeiffer
Mary Elizabeth Price
Leopold Seyffert
Mary Given Sheerer
Nan Sheets
Ben Solowey

Further reading

References

1870 births
1937 deaths
Artists from Philadelphia
Painters from Pennsylvania
American male painters
American landscape painters
19th-century American painters
20th-century American painters
Pennsylvania Academy of the Fine Arts alumni
19th-century American male artists
20th-century American male artists